The Rugrats film series is a series of animated comedy adventure films based on the popular Nickelodeon animated series, Rugrats, created by Arlene Klasky, Gábor Csupó, and Paul Germain. The three films were released in 1998, 2000, and 2003. The first and third films received mixed reviews, while the second received generally positive reviews. The series also experienced declining commercial success with each film.

Films

The Rugrats Movie (1998)

The story escalates when Tommy Pickles, is put into difficult situation with the birth of his new brother, Dil, who will not stop crying and is taking all of their parents' attention. Lil and Phil, suggest that Dil should be returned to the hospital, though Tommy and Chuckie object. They eventually get into the Reptar Wagon take a high-speed ride straight into the deep woods where they get lost. Being pursued by a wolf, the babies must find their way home. Meanwhile, Angelica Pickles sets out to find the babies after they accidentally take her Cynthia doll with them. This film guest stars David Spade as Ranger Frank, Whoopi Goldberg as Ranger Margret, and Tim Curry as Rex Pester.

Rugrats in Paris: The Movie (2000)

The film focuses on Chuckie Finster as he is on a search for a new mother. In this movie, Tommy's father, Stu, is invited to stay in Paris, France to rebuild a robotic Reptar used in a stage musical. After convincing from Angelica, Stu's child-hating boss, Coco LaBouche, attempts to marry Chuckie's father, Chas, just to become the head of her company, Chuckie and the other Rugrats must stop her from becoming his mother. This film guest stars Susan Sarandon as Coco LaBouche, John Lithgow as Jean-Claude, and Mako Iwamatsu as Mr. Yamaguchi. This is Christine Cavanaugh's final film role before her retirement in 2001 and death in 2014. The film features a classical version of the Rugrats theme song at the start of the film.

Rugrats Go Wild (2003)

This film is a crossover between the Rugrats and The Wild Thornberrys. In this film, Stu and Didi Pickles decide to take a vacation with their children, Tommy and Dil, with their friends coming along. However, the ship Stu has chartered is not especially seaworthy, and their party ends up stranded on an uncharted island in the Pacific. The kids decide to search for television personality Sir Nigel Thornberry, who is also on the island with his family. Meanwhile, Nigel's daughter, Eliza, who can talk to animals, meets Spike, the Pickles' dog. In addition to The Wild Thornberrys cast members reprising their roles, this film guest stars Bruce Willis as the voice of Spike, Chrissie Hynde as Siri the clouded leopard, and Ethan Phillips as Toa. This is also the first and only time Nancy Cartwright voiced Chuckie Finster in a film since his original voice actress retired in 2001. During its theatrical release, the film was presented with scratch-and-sniff cards (which were handed out at the box-office) to enhance the film experience. The scratch-and-sniff cards were also included on the home video version of the film. The film was the least successful of the series both critically and commercially.

Cast and crew

Voice cast

Crew

Reception

Box office performance

Critical and public response

See also
 Rugrats
 Rugrats revival
 Rugrats: Tales From The Crib
 Nickelodeon Movies

References

 
Film series introduced in 1998
American film series
Paramount Pictures animated films
English-language films
Animated film series
American children's animated adventure films
Adventure film series
Nickelodeon animated films
Rugrats (franchise)
Films based on television series
Paramount Pictures franchises